Hydroxymetronidazole is the main metabolite of metronidazole.  Both have antibiotic and antiprotozoal activity.

References

Nitroimidazoles
Human drug metabolites